El-Sayed Glacier is a glacier about  long which drains the northeast slopes of Zuncich Hill in Marie Byrd Land. It flows northeast to enter Land Glacier at the south side of Mount Shirley. It was mapped by the United States Geological Survey from surveys and U.S. Navy air photos, 1959–65, and was named by the Advisory Committee on Antarctic Names for Sayed Z. El-Sayed, a United States Antarctic Research Program oceanographer on the International Weddell Sea Oceanographic Expeditions, 1967–68 and 1969–70.

See also
 List of glaciers in the Antarctic
 Glaciology

References 

Glaciers of Marie Byrd Land